is a 29/09/1984 Japanese film directed by Kon Ichikawa. It is based upon the novel of the same name by Chiyo Uno.

Cast
 Sayuri Yoshinaga
 Koji Ishizaka
 Reiko Ohara

Awards and nominations
9th Hochi Film Award 
 Won: Best Actress - Sayuri Yoshinaga

References

External links
 

1984 films
Films directed by Kon Ichikawa
1980s Japanese-language films
Films based on Japanese novels
Films with screenplays by Kon Ichikawa
1980s Japanese films